James Edward Nelson OBE (16 September 1921 – 13 June 2014) was a rugby union international who represented Ireland from 1947 to 1954.

Early life and career
James Edward Nelson was born on 16 September 1921 in Belfast. He became a qualified accountant

Rugby union career
Nelson played his senior rugby for the Malone club. Nelson made his international debut on 6 December 1947  at Lansdowne Road in the Ireland vs Australia match and went on to play a further fifteen times for Ireland In 1950 he toured Australasia with the British Lions and he played in 19 games, including the four test matches. Of the twenty test matches he played for his national side and the Lions, he was on the winning side on eleven occasions. He played his final match for Ireland on 23 January 1954 at Colombes in the France vs Ireland match. He also played nine games for the Barbarians and captained the side against Cardiff in 1951 and also South Africa in 1952. He went on to serve on the Barbarians' committee from 1963 to 1967 and in 1982 was president of the IRFU.

References

1921 births
2014 deaths
Irish rugby union players
Ireland international rugby union players
Rugby union locks
British & Irish Lions rugby union players from Ireland
Barbarian F.C. players
Malone RFC players
Officers of the Order of the British Empire
Rugby union players from Belfast